The Idaho State Bengals Women's Basketball team represents Idaho State University in Pocatello, Idaho, United States. The school's team currently competes in the Big Sky Conference, and play their home games at Reed Gym.

History
Idaho State began play in 1974. They were members of the Intermountain from 1976 to 1978, the IMC in 1980 to 1982 before joining the Mountain West Athletic Conference (which merged with the Big Sky in 1988) in 1982. As of the end of the 2015–2016 season, they have an all-time record of 534–614. They have made seven postseason appearances, four in the NCAA Tournament (2001, 2007, 2012) and four in the WNIT (2004, 2006, 2008, 2013), and they have lost in the First Round each time.

NCAA tournament results

References

External links